Final Jeopardy is a 2001 drama TV film based on a novel by Linda Fairstein and starring Dana Delany. Delany also produced the film, which premiered on April 9, 2001 on ABC. The film was nominated for an Edgar Allan Poe Award for Best Television Feature or Miniseries in 2001.

Cast
 Dana Delany as Alexandra Cooper
 Billy Burke as Mike Chapman
 Joelle Carter as Sandra Bonventre
 Chris Potter as Jed Seigel
 Sherman Augustus as Mercer Wallace
 Jeff Clark as William Montvale
 Colm Feore as Paul Battaglia
 Fulvio Cecere as Luther Waldron
 Karen Robinson as Laura Wilkie
 Jonathan Higgins as Patrick 'Pat' McKinney
 Arnold Pinnock as Herman Miller
 Joe Pingue as Harold McCoy
 Bill Lake as Chief Flanders

See also
List of television films produced for American Broadcasting Company

References

External links
 

2001 television films
2001 films
Films directed by Nick Gomez
2001 drama films
American drama television films
2000s American films